Ernest Thomas "Bob" Lilley M.M., B.E.M. (10 February 1914 – 14 August 1981) was a British Army soldier. A founding member of the British Special Air Service Regiment, he formerly served with the Coldstream Guards. Lilley was one of the first four men selected by Colonel David Stirling to comprise L Detachment 1st S.A.S. in Middle East Headquarters at Cairo in 1940. He took part in many operations behind enemy lines in Libya against Italian and German forces during World War II.

Career
Lilley was born at Wolverhampton on 10 February 1914. During the Second World War he enlisted into the Coldstream Guards in September 1940 and was one of the founding members of 'L’ Detachment, having joined from No. 8 Commando in September 1941, as one of the Tobruk Four (the others being Pat Riley, Jim Almonds, Jim Blakeney) under officer Lieutenant Jock Lewes, who was killed in December the same year and of whom David Stirling later wrote: "Jock could far more genuinely claim to be the founder of the S.A.S. than I." Prior to joining 'L' Detachment Sgt Lilley along with Jock Lewes was seconded to Layforce and took part in operations. Subsequently, when Layforce was disbanded Sgt Lilley was attached to 30 Commando and thereafter selected along with Jock Lewis by David Stirling to become part of 'L' Detachment.

After joining the Coldstream Guards and being posted to North Africa he came to be known as one of the "Tobruk Four" because of the courageous acts he and the other three carried out during the battle for Tobruk. Lilley had served in the SAS since it was first formed in 1941 and won numerous awards for his bravery and service during his time in the British army. These included the Military Medal and the British Empire Medal.

Lilley won the Military Medal in November 1942 for his heroism during a daring raid before continuing to serve the SAS until his discharge in 1958.

He was appointed Regimental Sergeant Major of 21 Special Air Service Regiment in 1950 and was awarded the British Empire Medal for his services in 1952.

In Special Forces circles, the term boblilley refers to a commando hit-and-run operation.

Commendations
In May 1942 Stirling wrote a recommendation for an award of the Military Medal:

In his commendation his GOC Commander Lieutenant Colonel A.C. Newman, called him:

Lilley was twice Mentioned in Dispatches. The first in January 1944

On August 1951, Lieutenant Colonel A. C. Newman, VC, commanding officer of the 21st S.A.S. Regiment, wrote:

Missions and operations

Lilley took part in many operations and missions in North Africa during World War II but perhaps his most acclaimed operation was on the return from a hit and run mission in 1941. Lilley was in a truck with Jock Lewes and David Stirling. Lilley suddenly yelled out for everyone to jump out of the LRDG Chevrolet truck. Lilley had smelled burning and realised that one of the timers pencils in the explosive bombs had activated. Mere seconds after they scrambled out, the truck blew up. Bob Lilley by his quick reaction had saved their lives.

Lilley was a member of the British Commando team who were parachuted into Norway to destroy the heavy water facility. On completion of the mission he returned from Norway back to the UK by submarine. Lilley later received a certificate of thanks from the King Olav of Norway in December 1945. The letter from King Olav forms part of the Bob Lilley collection.

Post-war, Lilley continued to serve with the SAS, including at least two operational tours in Malaya, his parent unit changing to the South Staffordshire Regiment. Prior to taking his discharge in 1958 he served seven years with 21 Special Air Service Regiment. After his service Lilley retired to Folkestone, Kent and set up a Guest house where many of his old SAS comrades would come and enjoy spending many a happy weekend reminiscing. Lilley died in August 1981 at the age of 67 in Folkestone, Kent. His funeral on 21 August 1981 was attended by Colonel David Stirling and other surviving notables from the SAS originals of 'L' Detachment 1st SAS.

It is reported by a serving officer of 21 SAS that a portrait of Sgt Lilley hangs on the walls of Officer's Mess at the Regimental HQ in Hereford.

The RSM of 21st SAS before Lilley was RSM John Alcock - Croix de Guerre with Silver Star. He was appointed in 1947 and his appointment is recorded in the SAS Newsletter of 1947. Like Lilley he was an ex-Coldstream Guardsman who had fought at Dunkirk.

References

Further reading
 
 
 
 
 
 
 
 
 
 

Special Air Service soldiers
Western Desert campaign
1914 births
1981 deaths
British Army personnel of World War II
Coldstream Guards soldiers
South Staffordshire Regiment soldiers
Recipients of the Military Medal
Recipients of the British Empire Medal
People from Wolverhampton
Military personnel from Staffordshire